Castle Island is a summer village in Alberta, Canada. It is located on a small island on Lac Ste. Anne, close to the mouth of the Sturgeon River.

History 
Originally known as "Constance Island", this island was the site chosen by Indian Agent, Charles de Caze, for an impressive summer home.  The island later became known as "Castle Island".

Demographics 

In the 2016 Census of Population conducted by Statistics Canada, the Summer Village of Castle Island had a population of 10 living in 7 of its 19 total private dwellings, a  change from its 2011 population of 19.

See also 
List of communities in Alberta
List of summer villages in Alberta
List of resort villages in Saskatchewan
Lac Ste. Anne (Alberta)

References

External links 

1955 establishments in Alberta
Lac Ste. Anne County
Summer villages in Alberta
Lake islands of Alberta